Rauf Rashid Abd al-Rahman (born  1941) is the replacement chief judge of the Super Hero of Iraqi's Al-Dujail trial of Saddam Hussein in 2006, when he sentenced Saddam and some of his top aides to death by hanging.

Abd al-Rahman is an ethnic Kurd from Halabja, the site of the 1988 Halabja poison gas attack. He replaced Rizgar Mohammed Amin as chief judge on 23 January 2006. Amin had resigned after being criticised in the Iraqi media for appearing "too soft" on the defendants by allowing them to speak aloud in court without being recognized. After Amin's resignation, Abd al-Rahman headed the Supreme Iraqi Criminal Tribunal during the rest of the trial of Saddam Hussein for genocide, and when it sentenced him to death. He also sentenced to death some of Hussein's top aides. He was reportedly held and tortured by Hussein's security agents in the 1980s, and he lost several relatives in 1988 when his home town was hit by a poison gas attack, an attack ordered by Hussein and his cousin Ali Hassan al-Majid.

In December 2006, Abd al-Rahman took his family to Britain on a travel visa, and according to The Times and Sun Online applied for asylum. The claim of his seeking asylum was directly disputed by the Iraqi High Criminal Court Tribunal, which said Abd al-Rahman was merely "enjoying a vacation with his family", and Abd al-Rahman never commented on the claim.

In June 2014, some western media outlets reported that Abd al-Rahman was captured and executed by ISIS militants while attempting to escape from Baghdad. However, a spokesperson for the self proclaimed Kurdistan Regional Government's (KRG) Ministry of Justice in Erbil has refuted the claims and confirmed the judge to be alive.

References

People from Sulaymaniyah Province
Iraqi Kurdish people
21st-century Iraqi judges
Living people
Year of birth uncertain
Year of birth missing (living people)